Memory of Mankind (MOM) is a preservation project funded in 2012 by Martin Kunze. The main goal is to preserve the knowledge about present human civilization from oblivion and collective amnesia. Information is printed on ceramic tablets, then stored in the salt mine of Hallstatt, Austria. More than a simple archive project, it aims to create the "time capsule of our era", letting people participate by allowing them to submit texts and images. In contrast to national archives, content for MOM is collected by anyone who takes part. It is a collective, "bottom-up" told history.

History
The project was started by ceramicist Martin Kunze. His earliest experience with a time capsule was in the early 1980s, when, as a 13-year-old, he buried a bottle at the beach with a message containing his name and phone number. Thirty years later, someone found it.

Circa 2008, Kunze read Alan Weisman's non-fiction work The World Without Us, which included the observation that ceramic objects had the greatest chance to survive into the future. This, coupled with the knowledge that the Internet already contributes 2% of CO2 emissions, let Kunze to think about a ceramic time capsule. Part of the inspiration came from an art project by a classmate, who had written "feminine experiences" on ceramic tablets.

In 2012, the Memory of Mankind started with the first tablet, with a greeting to future finders, an explanation about the project, and a date expressed in terms of astronomical events. By 2018, the project had over 500 tablets. Claudia Theune, archaeologist from University of Vienna, was one of the earliest supporters. Thomas Grill, sound artist and researcher, developed how to represent sound in the archive.

Ambitions 
Several motivations underlie the project. The primary ambition of MOM is to preserve an image of our era, created by numerous participants all over the planet. MOM will also contain information which our society is obliged to forward to the future, e.g. descriptions of nuclear waste repositories. MOM collaborates with the NEA and SKB.

Although the most obvious ambition often described in the media is preserving our knowledge, this is not the primary goal of MOM. Serving as a time capsule, MOM is both: in a time frame of millennia it is the story of humanity, and in a time frame of decades it is a backup. In times where global warming, nuclear danger and biological warfare threaten the existence of civilization, saving the core knowledge and culture acquired over centuries is a backup measure. In case of a collapse, the MOM project could help survivors to rebuild civilization. Linked to this, another reason is political order: facing the lack of reactivity of authorities concerning global warming, the MOM project is a reminder of what can happen. The Ancient Roman and Greek civilizations whose histories have been reconstructed by the small percentage of texts and artifacts which survived to the 21st century are examples that have inspired the MOM project.

Finally, the project is intended as a critique of our digital civilization—according to Kunze, nothing of the 21st century may last in the future, since most of our interactions are now virtual. The conflict of "accuracy versus bullshit" is one of the main themes of the MOM project. The project can only aim to save a fragment of the information produced until today, Kunze says, but this fragment has to be representative.

The project is open to the public and its creator emphasizes that it is not a "doomsday project".

Content 

Collecting content is inevitably subject to bias. In order to take this into account, the content is split into three sections and as much meta-information as necessary is added to any contribution in order to enable future finders to apply source criticism. The collecting process is not centralized, subject to every country/region/entity.

The three sections are:
 Individual content: content uploaded by individuals, accompanied by a declaration of why this particular text is worthy of preservation. Each individual content is marked as "private content" in the overall MOM index;
 General content: content collected automatically to avoid bias, e.g. collecting the daily editorials of newspapers worldwide, randomly selected Facebook profiles, weekly/monthly magazines of different topics (with the "meta information": numbers of readers; reason for selection of the respective magazine; description of the target group). The language-deciphering tool ("pictionary”) is also part of this section; 
 Specific content: in this section MOM is used as a "medium". Outside institutions bring content to MOM and use the storage and ceramic microfilm. Examples include the nuclear industry (information about waste repositories). Universities use MOM for awards.

The salt mine 
The Hallstatt salt mine is the oldest salt mine continuously exploited by humans. Several factors contribute to its suitability for the MOM archives. As well as the depth and relative stability of the mine, the salt absorbs moisture and desiccates the air, and has a natural plasticity that helps to seal cracks and fractures keeping the caverns watertight.

The geology dictates that over time, the archive will rise up to the surface. Since the mouth of the cavern closes at about the rate of fingernail growth, the project has about 40 years to be completed. Under Austrian law, the archive is considered to be "like waste", and ownerless.

Ceramic data carriers 

Sumerian clay tablets greatly inspired MOM's tablets. These modern variants are made of a ceramic material that is capable of preserving the information that they contain, as it is less vulnerable to corrosion, biological degradation, and ordinary weathering, and wears for a longer time than other materials which have been used to record information – it resists temperatures of up to 1200 °C (2200 °F), chemicals, water, radiation, magnetism and pressure and can "only be destroyed by a hammer" (even if a tablet breaks, information will not disappear). The goal is to have the most durable support available, able to carry the message over a long span of time (one million years).

The tablets measure 20x20 cm. One type carries images and text with a 300 dpi resolution, while the other type is "ceramic microfilm" and carries up to 5 million characters. It is a requirement that the information be analog and recognizable as data to future finders.

Variations of languages over time and even the hypothesis of an alien intelligence discovering the MOM archives have been anticipated. Again, the creators of MOM take inspiration from historical methods. They designed their own "Rosetta Stone", translated in several languages with the appropriate character set and number system, an astronomical time indicating “2013” (via extremely rare events of simultaneous transits of Mercury and Venus) and thousands of images depicting concrete situations with the corresponding words, completed by the theoretical volumes of the main languages, e.g. phrases, grammar, thesauruses, orthography.

The Token and ceremonial gathering 

A token (a disc 6,5 cm in diameter) will be given to all participants of the MOM project. On its limited surface, the token indicates a spot on Earth with a precision of some ten meters. The front side depicts the outline of Europe, with a mark representing  Hallstatt's location. The backside shows the position of the entrance to the MOM relative to the shape of the Hallstatt Lake. In addition, a multi-cubic shape representing the crystalline structure of the mine's salt is included. Due to the design of MOM and the token, the archive can only be retrieved by a society with a similar technical and physical understanding of the world to modern-era humans. This is intended to ensure that techniques to decode the content are available to future finders.

An "Ariadne's thread" in the form of ceramic tablets with mathematical indications of the direction and depth will be placed in the entrance tunnel, including "gaps", which are also mathematically indicated, in order to avoid accidental recovery by an immature society.

An instruction for a rite is attached to this token: the owners are supposed to gather every 50 years to commemorate and decide whether humanity still knows the content of MOM and if extensions are needed. The token should be transmitted to the descendants of the owners.

Unlike other time capsules which predefine opening dates (not considering if at that point an appropriate addressee will exist), MOM's token defines the culture rather than the date of the opening by ensuring a pre-mature society would be unable to interpret the token.

Crowdfunding aspect 
Memory of Mankind distinguishes itself by asking for contributions from both public and private entities, be they companies or common people. Contributions can be financial or simply content to be stored. Cooking recipes and personal stories are examples of contributions that may be stored. In exchange for a contribution above a certain character minimum, the contributor receives one of the ceramic tokens.

Costs 
MOM is a global project: in order to enable citizens of every country to represent themselves the costs for tablets vary based on the gross national income per capita ranking table of the World Bank.

Gallery

See also 
 Memory of the World Programme
 Svalbard Global Seed Vault
 List of time capsules
 Long Now Foundation

References

External links 

 
 Human Document Project (similar project)

Upper Austria
2012 in Austria